Arriva Rail London is a train operating company owned by Arriva UK Trains that operates the London Overground concession on behalf of Transport for London.

History
In April 2015, Transport for London placed a notice in the Official Journal of the European Union, inviting expressions of interest in operating the next concession. In July 2015, Transport for London announced the shortlisted bidders for the next concession were Arriva UK Trains, ComfortDelGro, Govia and MTR Corporation.

In March 2016, Arriva was awarded a seven-and-a-half-year concession with an option to extend for a further two years. Operations commenced on 13 November 2016. Arriva held a 50% shareholding in the previous concession holder, London Overground Rail Operations.

Services

Rolling stock
Arriva Rail London inherited a fleet of Class 172, Class 315, Class 317 and Class 378s. From 2019, the first of 54 Class 710s will be delivered. These will replace the Class 172, Class 315 and Class 317s, and the Class 378s on Watford DC line duties, allowing them to be concentrated on North London line, East London line, West London line and South London line services.

On 22 May 2019 TfL announced that approval had been gained for the Class 710s to enter passenger service. The first two units entered service on the Gospel Oak to Barking Line on Thursday 23 May 2019 and the remaining six were in service by August 2019, with the first unit entering service on the Watford DC line on 9 September 2019. The first units on the Lea Valley lines entered service on 3 March 2020 after a first attempt on 24 February 2020. Their use on Romford–Upminster line services began in October 2020.

Current fleet

Past fleet
Former train types operated by Arriva Rail London include:

Depots
Arriva Rail London's fleet is maintained at Ilford, New Cross Gate and Willesden depots.

References

External links 
 

Arriva Group companies
British companies established in 2016
London Overground
Railway companies established in 2016
2016 establishments in England